Mark Scerri (born 16 January 1990) is a Maltese international footballer who plays for Sliema Wanderers, as a midfielder.

Career
Scerri has played club football for Sliema Wanderers.

He made his international debut for Malta in 2013.

References

1990 births
Living people
Maltese footballers
Malta international footballers
Association football midfielders
Sliema Wanderers F.C. players